The Old Boy Network is a British comedy television series which first aired on ITV in 1992. Created by the writing team of Dick Clement and Ian La Frenais, it is a parody of various spy films and series.

Main cast
 Tom Conti as Lucas Frye (7 episodes)
 John Standing as Peter Duckham (7 episodes)
 Robert Lang as  Sir Roland White (6 episodes)
 Georgia Allen as Tamsin (5 episodes)
 Jayne Brook as Parker Morrow (4 episodes)
 Annie Lambert as Sophie Duckham (2 episodes)
 Brian Miller as  Percy (2 episodes)
 Richard Syms as Munton (2 episodes)

References

Bibliography
 Horace Newcomb. Encyclopedia of Television. Routledge, 2014.

External links
 

ITV sitcoms
1992 British television series debuts
1992 British television series endings
1990s British comedy television series
English-language television shows